In 2017, Kent County Cricket Club competed in Division Two of the County Championship, the Royal London One-Day Cup and the NatWest t20 Blast. In addition, before the start of the English cricket season, Kent competed in the 2016–17 Regional Super50, the List A competition of the West Indian domestic season. This was the first time that any English county had competed in an overseas domestic competition. The invitation to take part in the tournament was largely due to the influence of former West Indian captain Jimmy Adams who had been Kent's Head Coach until September 2016.

The season was the first in charge for new head coach and former player, Matthew Walker. Former South African fast-bowler Allan Donald was announced as the new assistant coach, but his arrival was delayed while he worked towards the ECB level three qualification he required to gain the visa necessary to take up the role. Former Yorkshire coach, and Australia fast-bowler, Jason Gillespie was appointed as assistant coach on an interim basis for the first few weeks of the season. It was later announced that Donald would not be joining up with Kent until 2018. Sam Northeast retained the club captaincy for a second season.

Joe Denly won the club's Player of the Year award, having scored over 1,895 runs across all formats.

Squad

Departures
Fast bowler David Griffiths left the club at the end of his contract in September 2016 after three seasons with Kent and academy graduate Sam Weller left without having played for the first XI (he had played 6 First Class matches for Oxford MCCU during his time with Kent).
Hardus Viljoen, who had a brief spell with Kent as an overseas player at the end of the 2016 season, signed a Kolpak deal with Derbyshire. Reports suggest that Kent had first refusal on signing Viljoen, but opted not to match Derbyshire's offer.

On the eve of the season Fabian Cowdrey left the club by mutual consent to pursue opportunities outside of cricket.

Adam Ball, Hugh Bernard and Charlie Hartley were released by Kent at the end of the season. Matt Coles also left his home county to join county champions Essex in October.

Arrivals
Having impressed while on loan at the county in 2016, Will Gidman signed a permanent contract with Kent in October 2016 after he was released by Nottinghamshire. Academy wicket-keeper Ollie Robinson made his senior debut for the county in the final match of the 2016–17 Regional Super50 tournament after being called into the touring squad as cover for Adam Rouse with Sam Billings away on England duty. Robinson went on to sign his first professional contract with the club at the end of the season. In March, Kent announced the signing of former England Under 19 captain Joe Weatherley on loan from Hampshire for the 2017 season, although he stayed with the county only for the first half of the season. Middlesex fast bowler James Harris followed as another loan signing in early April, initially for the first three County Championship matches and the first section of the 2017 Royal London One-Day Cup.

On 10 April, Kent announced the signing of South African international left-arm fast bowler Wayne Parnell, who had previously played for the county during the 2009 season, as an overseas player on a short-term contract. Parnell was available to play in the County Championship and Royal London One-Day Cup until he joined up with the South African national team when they began their tour of England in May. New Zealand fast bowler Adam Milne joined the team as an overseas player for the second half of the season after the conclusion of the ICC Champions Trophy that took place in England and Wales during the first half of June and Pakistan leg-spinner Yasir Shah played two County Championship games during the middle of the season. Zealand all-rounder Jimmy Neesham played in the T20 Blast campaign alongside Milne.

Australian-born fast-bowling all-rounder Grant Stewart signed his first professional contract with Kent at the end of August after impressing while on trial with the second XI as well as in the Kent Premier League with Sandwich Town. He holds an EU passport through his Italian mother and was not classed as an overseas player.

Squad list
 Ages given as of the first day of the 2017 County Championship season, 7 April 2017.

Regional Super50
At the beginning of the year, Kent competed in the 2016–17 Regional Super50, a List A tournament that is part of the West Indian domestic season, after accepting an invitation from the West Indies Cricket Board. The competition took place between 24 January and 18 February. It was the first time that Kent had competed in an overseas competition.

Kent were drawn in Group A, and played two matches against each of the other teams in the group: Leeward Islands, Trinidad and Tobago, Windward Islands and the West Indies under-19 cricket team. Group B included the other three regular teams of West Indian domestic cricket (Barbados, Guyana and Jamaica) and two development sides (Combined Campuses and Colleges and ICC Americas).

Kent began the tournament with a seven wicket loss to the Leeward islands at the Coolidge Cricket Ground in Antigua before consecutive wins against Trinidad and Tobago and Windward Islands. Four consecutive losses saw the county knocked out of the tournament at the group stage before a win in their final match of the competition. The tournament was viewed by Kent as an opportunity for warm weather preparation for the English domestic season.

Group A

Matches

County Championship
Kent played 14 County Championship Division Two matches in 2017. The Championship was restructured for 2017, with Division Two having ten teams, leaving the remaining eight counties in Division One instead of the previous nine-nine split. Teams in both divisions played fewer matches than in 2016 (14 instead of 16), meaning that teams in Division Two played five of their rivals twice and the other four teams only once during the season.

Kent's opening fixture was at home against Gloucestershire, starting on 7 April at the St Lawrence Ground, a match they won by 334 runs after bowling Gloucestershire out for a total of 61 in their second innings with Darren Stevens taking 6/22. They played seven home matches in total, five at the St Lawrence Ground and one each at the Nevill Ground in Tunbridge Wells and the County Cricket Ground, Beckenham. One fixture, an away game against Nottinghamshire, was a day–night match, part of an experiment by the England and Wales Cricket Board ahead of the staging of the first UK day–night Test match in August.

Kent started strongly, winning four of their first five matches. However, in a frustrating remainder of the season they failed to win any further matches in the championship and slipped to 5th place in the table. One match, against Derbyshire at Queen's Park, Chesterfield in September, was abandoned as a draw without a ball being bowled due to heavy rain and a wet outfield. As a result the team only played 13 of the scheduled 14 matches.

Division Two

Matches

Other first-class matches
Kent began the 2017 English cricket season with a three-day University match against Leeds/Bradford MCC University on 28 March and played a three-day match against the touring West Indians at the beginning of August. The fixture against the West Indians formed the centre-piece of the 166th Canterbury Cricket Week.

Royal London One-Day Cup
Kent competed in the South group of the 2017 Royal London One-Day Cup. They played each of the other eight teams in the group once, with all four home games being played at the St Lawrence Ground in Canterbury. A disappointing campaign saw Kent finish bottom of the table, with just a single win against Middlesex. After an early elimination, the starting eleven increasingly featured fringe squad players, particularly in the bowling department, and academy graduate batsman Zak Crawley made his senior debut in the final match against Essex.

Daniel Bell-Drummond had a good tournament, scoring successive centuries against Somerset and Sussex, as well as two half centuries. Alex Blake also scored a century against Somerset, his first in List A cricket, reaching 116 from just 58 balls. Darren Stevens, on his 300th List A appearance, scored a career-high 147 from just 67 deliveries (including 10 fours and 14 sixes) against Glamorgan at Swansea, almost leading Kent to an unlikely victory and setting a new record for Kent's highest individual score in List A cricket.

South Group

Matches

NatWest t20 Blast
Kent played in the South group of the 2017 NatWest t20 Blast. The county played 14 matches, facing each team in the group at least once. They played seven home matches, one at County Cricket Ground, Beckenham and the other six at the St Lawrence Ground in Canterbury. In a very tight group, Kent went into the final game against Surrey needing a win to progress to the quarter-finals, but lost by 10 runs.

Joe Denly scored two hundreds during the campaign. In a memorable match at The Oval against Surrey he scored 166 not out as Kent chased a total of 205 to win by eight wickets. Later in the tournament he scored 127 against Essex County Cricket Club at County Ground, Chelmsford as part of a first-wicket stand of 207 runs with Daniel Bell-Drummond. This set records for Kent's Twenty20 highest individual score and partnership and, as of the end of the season, was the highest partnership score for any wicket in T20 cricket in the UK, the third highest anywhere in the world and was a world record for the first wicket.

Adam Milne took five wickets in the fixture against Somerset and recorded Kent's best bowling figures in Twenty20 cricket with 5/11.

South Group

Matches

Statistics

Batting

Source: Cricinfo

Source: CricInfo

Source: CricInfo

Bowling

Source: CricInfo

Source: CricInfo

Source: CricInfo

References

External links
Kent home at ESPN cricinfo
Kent County Cricket Club official site

2017
2017 in English cricket